is a natural hot spring in Shiretoko National Park, Japan. It is on the Kamuiwakka River.

Gallery

See also 

 Onnetō Hot Falls

References 

Hot springs of Japan
Waterfalls of Japan
Landforms of Hokkaido